German submarine U-106 was a Type IXB U-boat of Nazi Germany's Kriegsmarine that operated during World War II. She was laid down on 26 November 1939 at DeSchiMAG AG Weser in Bremen as yard number 969, launched on 17 June 1940 and commissioned on 24 September. She was armed with six torpedo tubes and a 10.5 cm SK C/32 naval gun. U-106 was assigned to the 2nd U-boat Flotilla on 24 September 1940, in which she would serve for nearly three years.

U-106 was one of the most successful German submarines of World War II. She completed 10 wartime patrols and sank 22 ships totalling .

Design
German Type IXB submarines were slightly larger than the original German Type IX submarines, later designated IXA. U-106 had a displacement of  when at the surface and  while submerged. She had two shafts and two  propellers.

U-106 was fitted with six  torpedo tubes (four fitted at the bow and two at the stern), 22 torpedoes, one  SK C/32 naval gun, 180 rounds, and a  SK C/30 as well as a  C/30 anti-aircraft gun. The boat had a complement of forty-eight.

Service history

1st patrol
U-106 departed Kiel for her first patrol on 4 January 1941 which was to be conducted in the Atlantic Ocean. Her route included negotiating the gap between the Faroe and Shetland Islands. She sailed north-west of Rockall and sank two ships: Zealandic on the 17th and Sesostris on the 29th. There were no survivors from either vessel.

The boat docked in Lorient in occupied France on 10 February.

2nd patrol
For her second patrol, U-106 departed Lorient on 26 February 1941. She would not return to France until 17 June 112 days later. The boat headed for the coast of west Africa. She sank seven more ships and damaged two others, including the battleship  in the vicinity of Senegal and the Cape Verde Islands. One of the seven, Eastlea, had her back broken and sank within ten minutes.

3rd patrol
Sortie number three and the U-boat failed to find any targets. She had left Lorient on 11 August 1941 and returned there a month later (on 11 September), having covered the ocean west of Ireland, also west of the Azores and from north of that island chain to the Portuguese mainland.

On 2 Sept., the submarine met the German freighter Anneliese Essberger at 37 degrees 55 minutes N and 37 degrees 24 minutes W. She then escorted the freighter until 8 Sept., when they reached western cape of the Spanish north coast. The freighter then continued onwards to Bordeaux.

4th patrol
Any success on the boat's fourth sally was marred on 23 October 1941 by the discovery that an entire watch, (four men), had been washed overboard in heavy seas on the western edge of the Bay of Biscay. U-106 sank one ship, King Malcolm on the 28th and damaged one other, on the 30th. She was then hunted for nine hours and seriously damaged by the escort vessels of convoy ON-28.

5th patrol
For her fifth patrol, U-106 sailed along the eastern coast of the United States and sank five ships, during the so-called "Second Happy Time". She had left Lorient on 3 January 1942 and returned on 22 February.

6th patrol
Patrol number six also benefitted from a change of operational area to the Gulf of Mexico, where the boat sank five more ships and damaged a sixth. One of them, the tanker Faja de Oro, on 21 May 1942, was the second ship to be sunk which helped to facilitate Mexico's declaration of war on Germany on 1 June.

7th and 8th patrols
U-106 was attacked by a Vickers Wellington of No. 311 Squadron RAF in the Bay of Biscay on 27 July 1942. The first watch officer (1WO) was killed; the commander was wounded, forcing the boat to put about, returning to Lorient on the 29th, just five days after setting out.

The submarine crossed the Atlantic once more, sinking Waterton in the Gulf of St. Lawrence on 11 October 1942.

9th patrol
This foray was comparatively uneventful, starting on 17 February 1943 and finishing on 4 April. No ships were attacked.

10th patrol
The U-boat's 10th and final patrol began on 28 July 1943; she was sunk on 2 August of that year off northern Spain, after being damaged by a Wellington of No. 407 Squadron RCAF.

Fate

While trying to join a fleet of E-boats (German surface torpedo boats), U-106 was spotted by a Sunderland flying boat of 228 Squadron flown by Flying Officer Reader Hanbury. Although the anti-aircraft guns on U-106 fended off the British flying boat that sighted it, U-106 was hit by a Sunderland from No. 461 Squadron RAAF flown by Flight Lieutenant A. F. Clarke.

According to the Allied crews and photographs taken of the attack, the U-boat partially exploded before sinking vertically. Of U-106s 48-man crew, 22 were killed. The 26 who survived the attack were later picked up by German E-boats.

Wolfpacks
U-106 took part in three wolfpacks, namely:
 Raubritter (1 – 15 November 1941) 
 Westwall (1 – 16 December 1942) 
 Unverzagt (12 – 22 March 1943)

Summary of raiding history

References

Notes

Citations

Bibliography

Bishop, C. Kriegsmarine U-Boats, 1939–45. Amber Books, 2006.
Bowyer, Chaz. Coastal Command at War. Ian Allan. 1979, 

Evans, J. The Sunderland: Flying Boat Queen Paterchurch Publications, 2004

External links

German Type IX submarines
U-boats commissioned in 1940
U-boats sunk in 1943
World War II submarines of Germany
Shipwrecks in the Bay of Biscay
World War II shipwrecks in the Atlantic Ocean
1940 ships
Ships built in Bremen (state)
U-boats sunk by British aircraft
U-boats sunk by Australian aircraft
Maritime incidents in August 1943